The Secretary to the President (sometimes dubbed the president's Private Secretary or Personal Secretary) was a 19th- and early 20th-century White House position that carried out all the tasks now spread throughout the modern White House Office. The Secretary would act as a buffer between the president and the public, keeping the president's schedules and appointments, managing his correspondence, managing the staff, communicating to the press as well as being a close aide and advisor to the president in a manner that often required great skill and discretion. In terms of rank it is a precursor to the modern White House Chief of Staff.

Stature
Every American president had a private secretary, but the position was not an official one until the McKinley administration. At the time of its peak the Secretary to the President was a much admired government office held by men of high ability and considered as worthy as a cabinet rank; it even merited an oath of office. Three private secretaries were later appointed to the Cabinet: George B. Cortelyou, John Hay and Daniel S. Lamont.

History 
During the nineteenth century, presidents had few staff resources. Thomas Jefferson had one messenger and one secretary (referred to as an amanuensis in the common parlance of the time) at his disposal, both of whose salaries were paid by the president personally. In fact, all presidents up to James Buchanan paid the salaries of their private secretaries out of their own pockets; these roles were usually fulfilled by their relatives, most often their sons or nephews. James K. Polk notably had his wife take the role.

It was during Buchanan's term at the White House in 1857 that the United States Congress created a definite office named the "Private Secretary at the White House" and appropriated for its incumbent a salary of $2,500. The first man to hold such office officially and to be paid by the government instead of by the president, was Buchanan's nephew J. B. Henry. By Ulysses S. Grant's presidency, the White House staff had grown to three.

By 1900, the office had grown in such stature that Congress elevated the position to "Secretary to the President", in addition to including on the White House staff two assistant secretaries, two executive clerks, a stenographer, and seven other office personnel. The first man to hold the office of Secretary to the President was John Addison Porter whose failing health meant he was soon succeeded by George B. Cortelyou. Radio and the advent of media coverage soon meant that Theodore Roosevelt and Woodrow Wilson too expanded the duties of their respective secretaries to dealing with reporters and giving daily press briefings.

Under Warren G. Harding, the size of the staff expanded to thirty-one, although most were clerical positions. During Herbert Hoover's presidency however, he tripled the staff adding two additional private secretaries (at a salary of $10,000 each – increased from $7,200) added by Congress. The first Hoover designated his Legislative Secretary (the senior Secretary now informally referred to by the press as the president's "No.1 Secretary" ), the second his Confidential Secretary, and the third his Appointments and Press Secretary.

In 1933, Franklin D. Roosevelt converted Hoover's two extra secretaries into the permanent White House Press Secretary and Appointments Secretary, but from 1933 to 1939, as he greatly expanded the scope of the federal government's policies and powers in response to the Great Depression, Roosevelt relied on his "Brain Trust" of top advisers. Although working directly for the president, they were often appointed to vacant positions in agencies and departments, from whence they drew their salaries since the White House lacked statutory or budgetary authority to create new staff positions. It wasn't until 1939, during Franklin D. Roosevelt's second term in office, that the foundations of the modern White House staff were created using a formal structure. Roosevelt was able to get Congress to approve the creation of the Executive Office of the President reporting directly to the president, which included the White House Office. As a consequence, the office of Secretary to the President was greatly diminished in stature (mostly due to the lack of a sufficient replacement to Roosevelt's confidant Louis McHenry Howe who had died in 1936) and had many of its duties supplanted by the Appointments Secretary.

In 1946, in response to the rapid growth of the U.S. government's executive branch, the position of Assistant to the President of the United States was established, and charged with the affairs of the White House. Together with the Appointments Secretary the two took responsibility of most of the president's affairs and at this point the Secretary to the President was charged with nothing other than managing the president's official correspondence before the office was discontinued at the close of the Truman administration.

In 1961, under Republican President Dwight D. Eisenhower, the president's pre-eminent assistant was designated the White House Chief of Staff. Assistant to the President became a rank generally shared by the Chief of Staff with such senior aides as Deputy Chiefs of Staff, the White House Counsel, the White House Press Secretary, and others. This new system didn't catch on straight away. Democrats Kennedy and Johnson still relied on their appointments secretaries instead and it was not until the Nixon administration that the Chief of Staff became a permanent fixture in the White House, and the appointments secretary was reduced to only functional importance. In the 1980s the job was re-designated to the White House Office of Appointments and Scheduling.

List of presidential secretaries

Private Secretary

Private Secretary to the White House

Secretary to the President

Appointments Secretary
The appointments secretary was the guardian of the president's time. He had the responsibility of acting as "gatekeeper" and decided who got to meet with him.

Eisenhower appointed Arthur H. Vandenberg Jr. to the position, but he took a leave of absence before Eisenhower's inauguration and later withdrew without ever having served.

Press Secretary

Personal secretary to the president
The prior role of Secretary to the President should not be confused with the modern president's personal secretary who is officially an administrative assistant in the Executive Office of the President. The role of personal secretary to the president should also not be confused with the personal aide to the president (commonly known as the "body man" or "body woman").

References

Sources
 

Executive Office of the President of the United States
United States presidential advisors
 
Secretaries